Siebera is a genus of plants in the tribe Cardueae within the family Asteraceae.

 Species
 Siebera nana (DC.) Bornm. - Israel, Palestine, Jordan, Lebanon, Syria, Turkey, Iran, Afghanistan
 Siebera pungens (Lam.) J.Gay  - Israel, Palestine, Jordan, Lebanon, Syria, Turkey

References

Cynareae
Asteraceae genera